Ovinius Gaius Julius Aquilius Paternus ( 3rd century) was a Roman senator who was appointed consul in AD 267.

Biography
Ovinius Paternus was a member of the Paterni, a prominent third century senatorial family. He was appointed consul prior in AD 267 alongside Arcesilaus. He exercised his duties in Rome while the emperor Gallienus was campaigning along the Danube against the Goths. In AD 281, Paternus was assigned by lot to a Proconsular province, either Africa or Asia, but in an unusual move he refused to accept the offered post. Instead, he took up the position of Praefectus urbi of Rome.

Footnotes

References

Sources
 Christol, Michel, Essai sur l'évolution des carrières sénatoriales dans la seconde moitié du IIIe siècle ap. J.C. (1986)
 Martindale, J. R.; Jones, A. H. M, The Prosopography of the Later Roman Empire, Vol. I AD 260–395, Cambridge University Press (1971)

3rd-century Romans
Imperial Roman consuls
Urban prefects of Rome
Year of birth unknown
Year of death unknown
Ovinii